Karl Ludwig Hencke (8 April 1793 – 21 September 1866) was a German amateur astronomer and discoverer of minor planets. He is sometimes confused with Johann Franz Encke, another German astronomer.

Biography
Hencke was born in Driesen, Brandenburg (now Drezdenko, Poland). He volunteered in the Wars of Liberation (Befreiungskriege) for Prussia but was wounded at Lützen. Thereafter he served as post official at various places and finally was erected post master. After his retirement at age 45 for health reasons he lived in his city of birth where he served as city court judge.

He discovered two asteroids from his private observatory at #9, Kietz (now #43, Kietzerstraße), Driesen, by comparing star maps with the sky seen through his telescope. The first, 5 Astraea, was the first asteroid discovered after the long gap that followed the last of the original four, 4 Vesta, which was discovered already in 1807. Other astronomers had abandoned their searches for more asteroids, convinced that there were only four. However, Hencke began searching in 1830, and fifteen years later met with success. Two years later he discovered his second asteroid 6 Hebe. He also worked on the improvement of star maps.

He died at the age of 73 in the northern Polish town of Kwidzyn, what was then called Marienwerder and part of Prussia. The asteroid 2005 Hencke – a main-belt asteroid of the Eunomia family, discovered by Swiss astronomer Paul Wild in 1973, was named in his memory.

References

External links 
 Biography search at www.deutsche-biographie.de
 Hencke, Karl Ludwig – from Nordisk familjebok by Projekt Runeberg (in Swedish)

1793 births
1866 deaths
Discoverers of asteroids
19th-century German astronomers
People from Drezdenko
People from the Margraviate of Brandenburg
People from Kwidzyn
Recipients of the Lalande Prize